Nina Radovanović (born 19 December 1991) is a Serbian boxer. She was born in Belgrade, capital of Serbia.

She is the first female boxer to represent Serbia in the 2020 Summer Olympics in Tokyo in the flyweight division.

References

External links

Serbian women boxers
Olympic boxers of Serbia
Living people
Sportspeople from Belgrade
Flyweight boxers
1991 births
Boxers at the 2020 Summer Olympics